Logan, Nevada, is a ghost town located in the hills about  west of Hiko and  south of Mount Irish Peak. Logan had its brief existence as a mining camp when silver ore was discovered in 1865 in the Mount Irish Range just to the north in Silver Canyon on the east flank of Mount Irish.

Variant names include Logan City, Logan Springs and Logans Springs.

The Logan Springs post office was in operation from July 1868 until August 1871.

A small spring of water called Logan Springs provided an essential resource for survival in such a harsh arid region.

References

External links
 Logan City (ghosttowns.com)

Ghost towns in Lincoln County, Nevada
Springs of Nevada
Bodies of water of Lincoln County, Nevada
Ghost towns in Nevada